Rolf Krauß (born 30 April 1954) is a German wrestler. He competed in the men's Greco-Roman 52 kg at the 1976 Summer Olympics.

References

External links
 

1954 births
Living people
German male sport wrestlers
Olympic wrestlers of West Germany
Wrestlers at the 1976 Summer Olympics
Sportspeople from Ludwigshafen